The Long Long Trail is a 1929 American pre-Code 
Western film directed by Arthur Rosson and starring Hoot Gibson in his first sound film. It was produced and released by Universal Pictures. The film survives and has been issued on DVD. The novel was filmed earlier in the silent The Ramblin' Kid (1923) which also starred Gibson.

Cast
 Hoot Gibson as The Ramblin Kid
 Sally Eilers as June
 Kathryn McGuire as Ophelia
 James "Jim" Mason as Mike Wilson
 Archie Ricks as Jyp
 Walter Brennan as "Skinny" Rawlins
 Howard Truesdale as Uncle Josh

References

External links
 
 
 Bowman, Earl Wayland, The Ramblin' Kid, New York: Grosset & Dunlap, with stills from the 1923 film, on the Internet Archive

1929 films
1929 Western (genre) films
American Western (genre) films
American black-and-white films
Films directed by Arthur Rosson
Transitional sound Western (genre) films
Universal Pictures films
1920s American films
1920s English-language films